Bartolomeo Scapuzzi (born 1750) was an Italian painter of the late-Baroque period.

He was born and active in Gaeta. He trained in Rome.
It is unclear how he relates to the 14th century painter Andrea Scapuzzi, who frescoed the ceiling of the chapel of the Holy Sacrament in the church of the Annunziata in Gaeta.

References

1750 births
Year of death unknown
People from Gaeta
18th-century Italian painters
Italian male painters
Italian Baroque painters
18th-century Italian male artists